Douliu is a railway station in Yunlin County, Taiwan served by Taiwan Railways. Yunlin HSR station can be accessed here by bus.

Overview 
The station has two island platforms. Ticketing and customer service are located in the main concourse on the second floor, while tracks are located in front of and behind the station. The station has an accessibility elevator.

History 

1904-02-01: The station opened as Toroku-eki (斗六驛).
1940: After an earthquake, the station was closed for three months for reconstruction.
November 1958: The second-generation station (with reinforced concrete) was completed.
2006-11-03: The second-generation station was demolished.
2008-12-19: The current cross-platform station opened for service.

Platform layout

Around the station 
 Douliou City area
 Huwei River
 Yunlin River
 Yunlin County Government
 House of Citizen-Memorial Hall of Attendance
 Douliu City Office
 National Yunlin University of Science and Technology
 TransWorld University
 Douliu High School
 Yunlin County Stadium

See also
 List of railway stations in Taiwan

References

External links 

 TRA Douliou Station 
 TRA Douliou Station

Railway stations served by Taiwan Railways Administration
Railway stations in Yunlin County
2008 establishments in Taiwan